Dixonius lao is a species of lizard in the family Gekkonidae. It is endemic to Laos.

References

Dixonius
Reptiles of Laos
Endemic fauna of Laos
Reptiles described in 2020
Taxa named by Thomas Ziegler (zoologist)